DNA-directed RNA polymerase III subunit RPC4 is an enzyme that in humans is encoded by the POLR3D gene.

This gene complements a temperature-sensitive mutant isolated from the BHK-21 Syrian hamster cell line. It leads to a block in progression through the G1 phase of the cell cycle at nonpermissive temperatures.

Interactions
POLR3D has been shown to interact with POLR3E.

References

Further reading